Dominic Eibu, (born 30 April 1970) is a Uganda Missionary Priest in the Catholic Church who was appointed as the Bishop of the Diocese of Kotido on 25 October 2022.

Background and priesthood 
Dominic was born on 30 April 1970 in Lwala, in the diocese of Soroti, Uganda. On 16 May 1998, he took his vows as a member of the Comboni Missionaries of the Heart of Jesus (MCCI) at the Institute of Comboni Missionaries in Namugongo, Kampala. He gave his perpetual vows on 12 January 2002 and was ordained a priest on 15 August 2002.

During his priesthood, he has served as director of the Comboni Primary School in Khartoum (2005-2016); vice superior general of the Combonian Province of Khartoum (2008-2013); member and secretary of the College of Consultors (2013-2016); secretary of the Presbyteral Council (2013-2016); secretary for education (2013-2016) and since 2017, school director and deputy parish priest in Cairo.

Before his appointment as bishop of Kotido Diocese, he was the parish priest of the Sacred Heart of Jesus parish in Cairo, vice superior general of Egypt-Sudan, and member of the Education Committee of the United Nations High Commission for Refugees.

As bishop 
Following the regnation of Bishop Giuseppe Filippi, Dominic was appointed Bishop of Kotido on 25 October 2022. He was consecrated and installed on 14 January 2023. Most Rev. Emmanuel Obbo, Archbishop of Tororo was the Principal Consecrator.

Succession table

References

External links 
 Profile of the Roman Catholic Archdiocese of Kotido

Living people
21st-century Roman Catholic bishops in Uganda
Roman Catholic bishops of Kotido
1970 births